Oronotus is a genus of parasitoid wasps belonging to the family Ichneumonidae.

The species of this genus are found in Europe and Africa.

Species:
 Oronotus albomaculatus Ashmead 
 Oronotus binotatus (Gravenhorst, 1829)

References

Ichneumonidae
Ichneumonidae genera